Glade Mountain, elevation , is the highest point in the Ellicott Rock Wilderness, which straddles Georgia, North Carolina and South Carolina.  It is also in the Chattahoochee National Forest in Rabun County, Georgia.

References 
Georgia's Named Summits
100 highest peaks in Georgia

External links 
Topographical map of Glade Mountain

Mountains of Georgia (U.S. state)
Mountains of Rabun County, Georgia
Chattahoochee-Oconee National Forest